Transatlantis is a 1995 German drama film directed by Christian Wagner. It was entered into the 45th Berlin International Film Festival.

Cast
 Daniel Olbrychski as Neuffer
 Birgit Aurell as Nele
 Jörg Hube as Brack
 Malgorzata Gebel as Solveig
 Otto Grünmandl as Rubacher
 Rolf Illig as Dr. Hilbig
 Hubert Mulzer as Gäbeles Hans
 Guenter Burger as Branko Ristic
 Michael Wogh as Herburger
 Karl Knaup as Weininger (as Karl-Heinz Knaup)
 Harry Meacher as Peary

References

External links

1995 films
1995 drama films
German drama films
1990s German-language films
Films directed by Christian Wagner
1990s German films